Pentaglottis is a monotypic genus of flowering plants in the family Boraginaceae. It is represented by a single species, Pentaglottis sempervirens, commonly known as the green alkanet, evergreen bugloss or alkanet,  and is a bristly, perennial plant native to southwestern Europe, in northwest Iberia and France. It grows to approximately 60 cm (24") to 90 cm (36"), usually in damp or shaded places and often close to buildings. It has brilliant blue flowers, and retains its green leaves through the winter.  The plant has difficulty growing in acidic soil (it is calcicolous). The name "alkanet" is also used for dyer's bugloss (Alkanna tinctoria) and common bugloss (Anchusa officinalis). Green alkanet is an introduced species in the British Isles.

The word "alkanet" derives from Middle English, from Old Spanish alcaneta, diminutive of alcana, "henna", from Medieval Latin alchanna, from Arabic al-ḥinnā’, "henna" : al-: "the" + ḥinnā’, "henna".  The genus name Pentaglottis is Greek, meaning "five tongues", and the species name sempervirens is Latin, and means "always alive", or "evergreen".

Green alkanet blooms in spring and early summer.  Its stamens are hidden inside narrow flower-tubes which end in a white eye in the centre of a blue flower.

References

Plants For A Future Pentaglottis sempervirens
VIRBOGA - Pentaglottis sempervirens

Boraginoideae
Plant dyes
Boraginaceae genera
Monotypic asterid genera